American country music singer Luke Bryan has released seven studio albums, seven compilation albums, eight extended plays, and 32 singles.

Bryan began his career with the release of I'll Stay Me in 2007 by Capitol Nashville, with the album spawning two top 10 hits on the Billboard Hot Country Songs chart: his debut single "All My Friends Say" (number five) and "Country Man" (number 10). His second studio album was released in 2009 titled Doin' My Thing, with the lead single "Do I" peaking at number two on Hot Country Songs. This album also produced his first two number one hits: "Rain Is a Good Thing" in July 2010 and "Someone Else Calling You Baby" in February 2011.

Bryan's next album was Tailgates & Tanlines, released in August 2011; it became his first number one on the Top Country Albums chart and produced four top five hits: "Country Girl (Shake It for Me)" (number four), as well as the number ones "I Don't Want This Night to End", "Drunk on You", and "Kiss Tomorrow Goodbye". His fourth studio album, Crash My Party, was released in August 2013 and became his second number one country album as well as his first number one on the all-genre Billboard 200. This album produced six additional number one singles in the title track, "That's My Kind of Night", "Drink a Beer", "Play It Again", "Roller Coaster", and "I See You". Kill the Lights was released in August 2015 and became Bryan's third number one country music album and his second number one on the Billboard 200. This album produced six additional number one singles: "Kick the Dust Up", "Strip It Down", "Home Alone Tonight", "Huntin', Fishin' and Lovin' Every Day", "Move", and "Fast".

On December 8, 2017, What Makes You Country was released, spawning three more number one singles: "Light It Up", "Most People Are Good", and "Sunrise, Sunburn, Sunset".

Born Here Live Here Die Here was released on August 7, 2020. Its preceding singles, "Knockin' Boots", "What She Wants Tonight", and "One Margarita" were three additional number ones. "Down to One" was the album's fourth number one followed by "Waves", a single exclusive to the album's deluxe edition, also reaching number one.

Starting in 2009, and until 2015, Bryan released an extended play or album each March to coincide with Spring Break and Farm Tour, starting with Spring Break with All My Friends and ending with Spring Break...Checkin' Out.

Studio albums

2000s

2010s

2020s

Compilation albums

Extended plays

Singles

2000s and 2010s

2020s

As featured artist

Other charted and certified songs

Music videos

Notes

References

Country music discographies
Discographies of American artists